Salvador Reyes is the name of:

Salvador Reyes Chávez (born 1998), Mexican footballer
Salvador Reyes Figueroa (1899–1970), writer
Salvador Reyes Monteón (1936–2012), Mexican football player
 Salvador Luis Reyes (born 1968), Mexican football player and manager